Calling Over Time is the debut album of Edith Frost, released in 1997 through Drag City.

Critical reception
The Chicago Tribune wrote that "the wistful title song unfurls in a beautifully coiling melody while 'Too Happy' incorporates a surprisingly light, almost jazzy tempo and a buoyantly extroverted tune." CMJ New Music Report wrote that Frost's "voice is so enticing that the listener is left with little choice but to listen again; it's then that Calling Over Time reveals itself." Pitchfork called the album "a stark, haunting character study that captures where Americana was headed at the turn of the century ... one of the decade’s most captivating debuts."

Track listing

Personnel 
Chuck Cors – photography
Edith Frost – vocals, guitar
David Grubbs – guitar
Rian Murphy – drums, production
Sean O'Hagan – synthesizer
Jim O'Rourke – guitar, mixing, recording
Rick Rizzo – guitar

References

External links 
 

1997 debut albums
Drag City (record label) albums
Edith Frost albums